Eurocentrism (also Eurocentricity or Western-centrism) is a worldview that is centered on Western civilization or a biased view that favors it over non-Western civilizations. The exact scope of Eurocentrism varies from the entire Western world to just the continent of Europe or even more narrowly, to Western Europe (especially during the Cold War). When the term is applied historically, it may be used in reference to an apologetic stance toward European colonialism and other forms of imperialism.

The term "Eurocentrism" dates back to the late 1970s but it did not become prevalent until the 1990s, when it was frequently applied in the context of decolonisation and development and humanitarian aid that industrialised countries offered to developing countries. The term has since been used to critique Western narratives of progress, Western scholars who have downplayed and ignored non-Western contributions, and to contrast Western epistemologies with Indigenous ways of knowing.

Terminology 

The adjective Eurocentric, or Europe-centric, has been in use in various contexts since at least the 1920s. The term was popularised (in French as européocentrique) in the context of decolonisation and internationalism in the mid-20th century. English usage of Eurocentric  as an ideological term in identity politics was current by the mid-1980s.

The abstract noun Eurocentrism (French eurocentrisme, earlier europocentrisme) as the term for an ideology was coined in the 1970s by the Egyptian Marxian economist Samir Amin, then director of the African Institute for Economic Development and Planning of the United Nations Economic Commission for Africa. Amin used the term in the context of a global, core-periphery or dependency model of capitalist development. English usage of Eurocentrism is recorded by 1979.

The coinage of Western-centrism is younger, attested in the late 1990s, and specific to English.

History
According to historian Enrique Dussel, Eurocentrism has its roots in Hellenocentrism.

European exceptionalism

During the European colonial era, encyclopaedias often sought to give a rationale for the predominance of European rule during the colonial period by referring to a special position taken by Europe compared to the other continents.

Thus Johann Heinrich Zedler, in 1741, wrote that "even though Europe is the smallest of the world's four continents, it has for various reasons a position that places it before all others.... Its inhabitants have excellent customs, they are courteous and erudite in both sciences and crafts".

The Brockhaus Enzyklopädie (Conversations-Lexicon) of 1847 still expressed an ostensibly Eurocentric approach and claimed about Europe that "its geographical situation and its cultural and political significance is clearly the most important of the five continents, over which it has gained a most influential government both in material and even more so in cultural aspects".

European exceptionalism thus grew out of the Great Divergence of the Early Modern period, due to the combined effects of the Scientific Revolution, the Commercial Revolution, and the rise of colonial empires, the Industrial Revolution and a Second European colonisation wave.

European exceptionalism is widely reflected in popular genres of literature, especially in literature for young adults (for example, Rudyard Kipling's 1901 novel Kim) and in adventure-literature in general. Portrayal of European colonialism in such literature has been analysed in terms of Eurocentrism in retrospect, such as presenting idealised and often exaggeratedly masculine Western heroes, who conquered "savage" peoples in the remaining "dark spaces" of the globe.

The European miracle, a term coined by Eric Jones in 1981, refers to the surprising rise of Europe during the Early Modern period. During the 15th to 18th centuries, a great divergence took place, comprising the European Renaissance, the European age of discovery, the formation of European colonial empires, the Age of Reason, and the associated leap forward in technology and the development of capitalism and early industrialisation. As a result, by the 19th century European powers dominated world trade and world politics.

In Lectures on the Philosophy of History, published in 1837, Georg Wilhelm Friedrich Hegel saw  world history as starting in Asia but shifting to Greece and Italy, and then north of the Alps to France, Germany and England. Hegel interpreted India and China as stationary countries, lacking inner momentum. Hegel's China replaced the real historical development with a fixed, stable scenario, which made it the outsider of world history. Both India and China were waiting and anticipating a combination of certain factors from outside until they could acquire real progress in human civilisation. Hegel's ideas had a profound impact on western historiography and attitudes. Some scholars disagree with his ideas that the Oriental countries were outside of world history.

Max Weber (1864-1920) suggested that capitalism is the speciality of Europe, because  Oriental countries such as India and China do not contain the factors which would enable them to develop capitalism in a sufficient manner. Weber wrote and published many treatises in which he emphasized the distinctiveness of Europe. In The Protestant Ethic and the Spirit of Capitalism (1905), he wrote that the "rational" capitalism, manifested by its enterprises and mechanisms, only appeared in the Protestant western countries, and a series of generalised and universal cultural phenomena only appear in the west.

Even the state, with a written constitution and a government organised by trained administrators and constrained by rational law, only appears in the West, even though other regimes can also comprise states. ("Rationality" is a multi-layered term whose connotations are developed and escalated as with the social progress. Weber regarded rationality as a proprietary article for western capitalist society.)

Recent usage
Journalists detected Eurocentrism in reactions to Russia's invasion of Ukraine in February 2022, when the depth and scope of coverage and concern contrasted with (for example) that devoted to longer-running, bloodier and more vicious contemporary wars outside Europe such as those in Syria and in Yemen.

Anticolonialism
Even in the 19th century, anticolonial movements had developed claims about national traditions and values that were set against those of Europe in Africa and India. In some cases, as China, where local ideology was even more exclusionist than the Eurocentric one, Westernisation did not overwhelm longstanding Chinese attitudes to its own cultural centrality.

Orientalism developed in the late 18th century as a disproportionate Western interest in and idealisation of Eastern (i.e. Asian) cultures.

By the early 20th century, some historians, such as Arnold J. Toynbee, were attempting to construct multifocal models of world civilisations. Toynbee also drew attention in Europe to non-European historians, such as the medieval Tunisian scholar Ibn Khaldun. He also established links with Asian thinkers, such as through his dialogues with Daisaku Ikeda of Soka Gakkai International.

The explicit concept of Eurocentrism is a product of the period of decolonisation in the 1960s to 1970s. Its original context is the core-periphery or dependency model of capitalist development of Marxian economics.

Debate since 1990s
Eurocentrism has been a particularly important concept in development studies.
Brohman (1995) argued that Eurocentrism "perpetuated intellectual dependence on a restricted group of prestigious Western academic institutions that determine the subject matter and methods of research".

In treatises on historical or contemporary Eurocentrism that appeared since the 1990s, Eurocentrism is mostly cast in terms of dualisms such as civilised/barbaric or advanced/backward, developed/undeveloped, core/periphery, implying "evolutionary schemas through which societies inevitably progress", with a remnant of an "underlying presumption of a superior white Western self as referent of analysis" (640). Eurocentrism and the dualistic properties that it labels on non-European countries, cultures and persons have often been criticised in the political discourse of the 1990s and 2000s, particularly in the greater context of political correctness, race in the United States and affirmative action.

In the 1990s, there was a trend of criticising various geographic terms current in the English language as Eurocentric, such as the traditional division of Eurasia into Europe and Asia or the term Middle East.

Eric Sheppard, in 2005, argued that contemporary Marxism itself has Eurocentric traits (in spite of "Eurocentrism" originating in the vocabulary of Marxian economics), because it supposes that the third world must go through a stage of capitalism before "progressive social formations can be envisioned".

Andre Gunder Frank harshly criticised Eurocentrism. He believed that most scholars were the disciples of the social sciences and history guided by Eurocentrism. He criticised some Western scholars for their ideas that non-Western areas lack outstanding contributions in history, economy, ideology, politics and culture compared with the West. These scholars believed that the same contribution made by the West gives Westerners an advantage of endo-genetic momentum which is pushed towards the rest of the world, but Frank believed that the Oriental countries also contributed to the human civilisation in their own perspectives.

Arnold Toynbee in his A Study of History, gave a critical remark on Eurocentrism. He believed that although western capitalism shrouded the world and achieved a political unity based on its economy, the Western countries cannot "westernize" other countries. Toynbee concluded that Eurocentrism is characteristic of three misconceptions manifested by self-centerment, the fixed development of Oriental countries and linear progress.

There has been some debate on whether historical Eurocentrism qualifies as "just another ethnocentrism", as it is found in most of the world's cultures, especially in cultures with imperial aspirations, as in the Sinocentrism in China; in the Empire of Japan (c. 1868–1945), or during the American Century. James M. Blaut (2000) argued that Eurocentrism indeed went beyond other ethnocentrisms, as the scale of European colonial expansion was historically unprecedented and resulted in the formation of a "colonizer's model of the world".

Indigenous philosophies have been noted to greatly contrast with Eurocentric thought. Indigenous scholar James (Sákéj) Youngblood Henderson states that Eurocentricism contrasts greatly with Indigenous worldviews: "the discord between Aboriginal and Eurocentric worldviews is dramatic. It is a conflict between natural and artificial contexts." Indigenous scholars Norman K. Denzin and Yvonna S. Linco state that "in some ways, the epistemological critique initiated by Indigenous knowledge is more radical than other sociopolitical critiques of the West, for the Indigenous critique questions the very foundations of Western ways of knowing and being."

Academic discourse
The terms Afrocentrism vs. Eurocentrism have come to play a role in the 2000s to 2010s in the context of the academic discourse on race in the United States and critical whiteness studies, aiming to expose white supremacism and white privilege. Afrocentrist scholars, such as Molefi Asante, have argued that there is a prevalence of Eurocentric thought in the processing of much of academia on African affairs.  

In contrast, in an article, 'Eurocentrism and Academic Imperialism' by Professor Seyed Mohammad Marandi, from the University of Tehran, states that Eurocentric thought exists in almost all aspects of academia in many parts of the world, especially in the humanities. Edgar Alfred Bowring states that in the West, self-regard, self-congratulation and denigration of the 'Other' run more deeply and those tendencies have infected more aspects of their thinking, laws and policy than anywhere else. Luke Clossey and Nicholas Guyatt have measured the degree of Eurocentrism in the research programs of top history departments.

Some authors have focused on how scholars who denounce Eurocentrism often inadvertently reproduce Eurocentrism. The methodologist Audrey Alejandro refers to this process as a "recursive paradox": "It is a methodo-epistemological recursive paradox that [International Relations] critical scholars experience, producing a discourse that is implicitly counter-productive to the anti-Eurocentric values they advocate."

Latin America
Eurocentrism affected Latin America through colonial domination and expansion. This occurred through the application of new criteria meant to "impose a new social classification of the world population on a global scale". Based on this occurrence, a new social-historic identities were newly produced, although already produced in America. Some of these names include; 'Whites', 'Negroes', 'Blacks', 'Yellows', 'Olives', 'Indians', and 'Mestizos'. With the advantage of being located in the Atlantic basin, 'Whites' were in a privileged to control gold and silver production. The work which created the product was by 'Indians' and 'Negroes'. With the control of commercial capital from 'White' workers. And therefore, Europe or Western Europe emerged as the central place of new patterns and capitalist power.

In 1627, when English colonisers arrived in Barbados, they slaughtered the local indigenous inhabitants, and claimed the island for themselves.

Effect on beauty standards in Brazil 
The beauty ideal for females in Brazil is the "morena"; a mixed-race brown woman who is supposed to represent the best characteristics of every racial group in Brazil. According to Alexander Edmond's book Pretty Modern: Beauty, Sex, and Plastic Surgery in Brazil, whiteness plays a role in Latin American, specifically Brazilian, beauty standards, but it is not necessarily distinguished based on skin colour. Edmonds said the main ways to define whiteness in people in Brazil is by looking at their hair, nose, then mouth before considering skin colour. Edmonds focuses on the popularity of plastic surgery in Brazilian culture. Plastic surgeons usually applaud and flatter mixtures when emulating aesthetics for performing surgery, and the more popular mixture is African and European. This shapes beauty standards by racialising biological and popular beauty ideals to suggest that mixture with whiteness is better. Donna Goldstein's book Laughter Out of Place: Race, Class, Violence, and Sexuality in a Rio Shantytown also addresses how whiteness influences beauty in Brazil. Goldstein notes that in Brazil, there is a hierarchy for beauty that places being mixed race at the top and pure, un-admixed black characteristics at the bottom, calling them ugly.

Challenging these standards of beauty in Brazil would require society to "question the romantic and sexual appeal of whiteness." Goldstein said as a result, black bodies would have to be decommodified, and black women in particular have had to commodify their bodies to survive.

In Erica Lorraine William's Sex Tourism in Bahia: Ambiguous Entanglements, Williams addresses how European and white beauty standards have more privileges than darker skinned and black women in Brazil. Black women in Brazil have to strategise ways to receive more respect in spaces popular for sex tourism. Williams cites Alma Gulliermoprieto when she explains that there is a superiority given to light-skinned black women over darker-skinned black women as light-skinned women were considered more beautiful because they were "improved with white blood."

Islamic world 
Eurocentrism's effect on the Islamic world has predominantly come from a fundamental statement of preventing the account of lower-level explanation and account of Islamic cultures and their social evolution, mainly through eurocentrism's idealist construct. This construct has gained power from the historians revolving their conclusions around the idea of a central point that favours the notion that the evolution of societies and their progress are dictated by general tendencies, leading to the Islamic world's evolution becoming more of a philosophical topic of history instead of historical fact. Along with this, eurocentrism extends to trivialise and marginalise the philosophies, scientific contributions, cultures, and other additional facets of the Islamic world.

Stemming from Eurocentrism's innate bias towards Western civilisation came the creation of the concept of the "European Society," which favoured the components (mainly Christianity) of European civilisation and allowed eurocentrists to brand diverging societies and cultures as "uncivilized." Prevalent during the nineteenth century, the labelling of uncivilised in the eyes of eurocentrists enabled Western countries to classify non-European and non-white countries as inferior, and limit their inclusion and contribution in actions like international law. This exclusion was seen as acceptable by individuals like John Westlake, a professor of international law at the University of Cambridge at the time, who commented that countries with European civilisations should be who comprises the international society, and that countries like Turkey and Persia should only be allowed a part of international law. The figurative superiority resulting from the rise of "European Civilization" and the labels of "civilized" and "uncivilized" are partly responsible for eurocentrism's denial of Islamic social evolution, giving westerners the advantage of an early dismissal of such ideas regarding Oriental civilisations through comparisons to the West. Along with that, the rooted belief of the inferiority of non-white and non-Europeans has given justification for racial discrimination and discredit to the Islamic world, with much of these feelings still present today.

Orientalism 
Eurocentrism's reach has not only affected the perception of the cultures and civilisations of the Islamic world, but also the aspects and ideas of Orientalism, a cultural idea that distinguished the "Orient" of the East from the "Occidental" Western societies of Europe and North America, and which was originally created so that the social and cultural milestones of the Islamic and Oriental world would be recognised. This effect began to take place during the nineteenth century when the Orientalist ideals were distilled and shifted from topics of sensuality and deviating mentalities to what is described by Edward Said as "unchallenged coherence." Along with this shift came the creation of two types of orientalism: latent, which covered the Orient's constant durability through history, and manifest, a more dynamic orientalism that changes with the new discovery of information. The eurocentric influence is shown in the latter, as the nature of manifest Orientalism is to be altered with new findings, which leaves it vulnerable to the warping of its refiner's ideals and principles. In this state, eurocentrism has used orientalism to portray the Orient as "backwards" and bolster the superiority of the Western world and continue the undermining of their cultures to further the agenda of racial inequality.

With those wanting to represent the eurocentric ideals better by way of orientalism, there came a barrier of languages, being Arabic, Persian, and other similar languages. With more researchers wanting to study more of Orientalism, there was an assumption made about the languages of the Islamic world: that having the ability to transcribe the texts of the past Islamic world would give great knowledge and insight on oriental studies. In order to do this, many researchers underwent training in philology, believing that an understanding of the languages would be the only necessary training. This reasoning came as the belief at the time was that other studies like anthropology and sociology were deemed irrelevant as they did not believe it misleading to this portion of mankind. Through this action, eurocentric researchers' understanding of Oriental and Islamic culture was intentionally left undermined, foregoing the reasoning behind the actions and reasoning for the changes in culture documented by Islamic and Oriental texts and allowing for further possible Western influence on orientalism, and increasing the difficulty of identifying what is truly Oriental and what is considered Oriental by the West.

In the beauty industry

Due to colonialism, Eurocentric beauty ideals have had varying degrees impact on the cultures of non-Western countries. The influence on beauty ideals across the globe varies by region, with Eurocentric ideals have a strong impact in South Asia, but little to no impact in East Asia However, Eurocentric beauty ideals have also been on the decline in the United States, especially the success of Asian female models, may signal the breakdown in the hegemony of White American beauty ideals. In Vietnam, Eurocentric beauty ideals have been openly rejected, as local women consider Western women's ideal of beauty as being overweight, masculine and unattractive. 

Another study question the impact of Eurocentric beauty ideals in South Asia, and noted that Indian women won a relatively high number of international beauty pageants, and Indian media tends to use mostly Indian female models. These authors cite the dominance of the Bollywood film industry in India, which tends to minimize the impact of Western ideals.

Clark doll experiment 

In the 1940s, psychologists Kenneth and Mamie Clark conducted experiments called "the doll tests" to examine the psychological effects of segregation on African-American children. They tested children by presenting them four dolls, identical but different skin tone. They had to choose which doll they preferred and were asked the race of the doll. Most of the children chose the white doll. The Clark's stated in their results that the perception of the African-American children were altered by the discrimination they faced. The tested children also labelled positive descriptions to the white dolls.

One of the criticisms of this experiment is presented by Robin Bernstein, a professor of African and African American studies and women, gender, and sexuality. Her argument is that "the Clarks' tests were scientifically flawed. But she said that the tests did reflect a negative portrayal of black dolls in American theater and media that dates back to the Civil War era...." Thus, Bernstein said, the choices made by the subjects of the Clark doll tests was not necessarily an indication of black self-hatred. Instead, it was a cultural choice between two different toys—one that was to be loved and one that was to be physically harassed, as exemplified in performance and popular media. According to Bernstein, this argument "redeems the Clarks' child subjects by offering a new understanding of them not as psychologically damaged dupes, but instead as agential experts in children's culture."

Mexican doll experiment 
In 2012, Mexicans recreated the doll test. Mexico's National Council to Prevent Discrimination presented a video where children had to pick the "good doll," and the doll that looks like them. By doing this experiment, the researchers wanted to analyse the degree to which Mexican children are influenced by modern-day media accessible to them. Most of the children chose the white doll; they also stated that it looked like them. The people who carried out the study noted that Eurocentrism is deeply rooted in different cultures, including Latin cultures.

Beauty advertisements 

In East Asia, the impact of Euroentrism in beauty advertisements has been minimal, and there have even been anti-European undercurrents in local advertisements for female products. European models are hired for around half of advertisements made by European brands such as Estee Lauder and L’Oreal, while local Japanese cosmetics brands tend to use exclusively East Asian female models. 

The use of European female models has actually declined within Japan, and some Japanese skincare companies have discontinued the use of Western female models entirely, while others have even portrayed white women as explicitly inferior to Asian women. There is a widespread belief in Japan that Japanese women's skin color is "better" than white women's, and the placement of European female models in local advertisements is not perceived as an exaltation of white women.

Skin lightening 
Skin lightening has become a common practice throughout different areas of the globe. One motivation for the use of skin lightening products is to look more 'European'. In other cases, the practice began long before exposure to European beauty standards – tan skin was associated with lower-class field work, and thus constant exposure to sun, while having pale skin signified belonging to the upper-class. Many women risk their health using these products to obtain the skintone they desire. A study conducted by Dr Lamine Cissé observed the female population in some African countries. They found that 26% of women were using skin lightening creams at the time and 36% had used them at some time. The common products used were hydroquinone and corticosteroids. 75% of women who used these creams showed cutaneous adverse effects. Whitening products have also become popular in many areas in Asia like South Korea. With the rise of these products, research has been done to study the long term damage. Some complications experienced are exogenous ochronosis, impaired wound healing and wound dehiscence, the fish odour syndrome, nephropathy, steroid addiction syndrome, predisposition to infections, a broad spectrum of cutaneous and endocrinologic complications of corticosteroids, and suppression of hypothalamic‐pituitary‐adrenal axis.

South Korea 

Cosmetic surgery is popular in South Korea, often called "plastic surgery capital of the world". Prevalence of cosmetic surgery in South Korea is not rooted in Western beauty standards, but is instead primarily due to other factors, such as more general dissatisfaction with appearance and better chances on the job market. According to the International Society of Aesthetic Plastic Surgery, South Korea has the highest rates of plastic surgery procedures per capita in 2014. The most requested procedures are the blepharoplasty and rhinoplasty. Another procedure done in Korea is having the muscle under the tongue that connects to the bottom of the mouth surgically snipped. Parents have their children to undergo this surgery in order to pronounce English better.

See also

 Afrocentrism
 Americentrism
 The Crest of the Peacock: Non-European Roots of Mathematics
 The Eastern Origins of Western Civilisation
 Hellenocentrism
 History of Western civilisation
 Orientalism
 Pan-European identity
 Universalism in geography
 Western culture

References
Notes

Bibliography

 Samir Amin, Accumulation on a World Scale, Monthly Review Press, 1974.
 Samir Amin: L’eurocentrisme, critique d’une idéologie. Paris 1988, engl. Eurocentrism, Monthly Review Press 1989, 
Bernal, M. Black Athena: The Afroasiatic Roots of Classical Civilization, Rutgers University Press (1987) )
Bessis, Sophie (2003). Western Supremacy: The Triumph of an Idea.  Zed Books.   
 Blaut, J. M. (1993) The Colonizer's Model of the World: Geographical Diffusionism and Eurocentric History. Guilford Press. 
 Blaut, J. M. (2000) Eight Eurocentric Historians. Guilford Press. 

Frank, Andre Gunder (1998) ReOrient: Global Economy in the Asian Age. University of California Press.
 Haushofer, Karl (1924) Geopolitik des pazifischen Ozeans, Berlin, Kurt Vowinckel Verlag.
Van der Pijl, Kees, The Discipline of Western Supremacy: Modes of Foreign Relations and Political Economy, Volume III, Pluto Press, 2014, 

 Lambropoulos, Vassilis (1993) The Rise of Eurocentrism: Anatomy of interpretation, Princeton, New Jersey: Princeton University Press.

Lindqvist, Sven (1996). Exterminate all the brutes.  New Press, New York.  

Rabasa, Jose (1994) Inventing America: Spanish Historiography and the Formation of Eurocentrism (Oklahoma Project for Discourse and Theory, Vol 2), University of Oklahoma Press

Said, Edward (1978). Orientalism. Pantheon Books.  
Schmidl P.G. (2007) ҁUrḍī: Mu'ayyad (al‐Milla wa‐) al‐Dīn (Mu'ayyad ibn Barīk [Burayk]) al‐ҁUrḍī (al‐ҁĀmirī al‐Dimashqī). In: Hockey T. et al. (eds) The Biographical Encyclopedia of Astronomers. Springer, New York, NY
Shohat, Ella and Stam, Robert (1994) Unthinking Eurocentrism: multiculturalism and the media. New York: Routledge. 

Vlassopoulos, K. (2011). Unthinking the Greek polis: Ancient Greek history beyond Eurocentrism. Cambridge: Cambridge University Press.
Xypolia, Ilia (2016) "Eurocentrism and Orientalism" in The Encyclopedia of Postcolonial Studies

External links

Critiques of Eurocentrism Bibliography
Franzki, Hannah. "Eurocentrism." 2012. InterAmerican Wiki: Terms - Concepts - Critical Perspectives.

 
European-American culture
Ethnocentrism
Geocultural perspectives
Pan-Europeanism
Political neologisms
1970s neologisms
White supremacy
Western culture